Cyrillia zamponorum is a species of sea snail, a marine gastropod mollusk in the family Raphitomidae.

Description

Distribution
This marine species occurs in the Atlantic Ocean, the Gulf of Guinea off Sao Tome and Principe.

References

 Horro, J.; Rolán, E.; Gori, S. (2019). Raphitoma zamponorum a new species from São Tome Island (Gastropoda: Raphitomidae). Iberus. 37(1): 1–6..

External links
 Fassio, G.; Russini, V.; Pusateri, F.; Giannuzzi-Savelli, R.; Høisæter, T.; Puillandre, N.; Modica, M. V.; Oliverio, M. (2019). An assessment of Raphitoma and allied genera (Neogastropoda: Raphitomidae). Journal of Molluscan Studies. 85(4): 414-425

zamponorum
Gastropods described in 2019